The 1931–32 season was Galatasaray SK's 28th in existence. Galatasaray SK did not join the Istanbul Football League due to the disagreement regarding the match revenues and played only friendly matches. Galatasaray SK's did not participate the İstanbul Shield Organization either.

Friendly Matches

Kick-off listed in local time (EEST)

Kaideli Heykel

National Olympic Committee Cup

References
 Futbol vol.2. Galatasaray. Page: 562, 595. Tercüman Spor Ansiklopedisi. (1981)Tercüman Gazetecilik ve Matbaacılık AŞ.
 1931-1932 İstanbul Futbol Ligi. Türk Futbol Tarihi vol.1. page(48). (June 1992) Türkiye Futbol Federasyonu Yayınları.

External links
 Galatasaray Sports Club Official Website 
 Turkish Football Federation - Galatasaray A.Ş. 
 uefa.com - Galatasaray AŞ

Galatasaray S.K. (football) seasons
Turkish football clubs 1931–32 season
1930s in Istanbul